Robert Peter Tabo Gale (born 3 August 1977) is an English former professional footballer and coach. He serves as a youth coach for New York City FC's academy.

As a player, Gale began his career in England with Fulham before taking a break to focus on his coaching qualifications. He later appeared for Canadian clubs Winnipeg Alliance, Winnipeg Lucania and Sons of Italy. Gale has also coached the Canada national team from Under-16 to Under-20, and became the first head coach and general manager of Valour FC in June 2018. On September 23, 2021 the club announced that Gale would be relieved of his duties.

Playing career 
Gale was signed by Football League Third Division club Fulham as an associate schoolboy aged 14. After moving to Bedfordshire to study at university, he trained with Football League Second Division side Wycombe Wanderers for a year.

After injury ruled Gale out for a full season and he graduated from university, he turned his attention to coaching and earned qualifications in England and the United States. Upon moving to Canada in 2001, Gale resumed his playing career and was named captained of indoor professional club the Winnipeg Alliance. He later played for Winnipeg Lucania and the Sons of Italy before retiring in 2012.

Coaching career

Early career 
Initially working as a director for summer camps across the United States and the Ian Rush Finishing Schools, Gale became the director of soccer at Spencer High School in Iowa in 2001. After two years, he became director for a North American academy run by Fulham, and later became the Canada national director for Charlton Athletic's sports academy.

Canada Soccer 
In 2006, Gale was named technical director for the Manitoba Soccer Association. In 2010, he became assistant coach for the Canada U17 men's national team and saw the team qualify for successive FIFA Under-17 World Cup tournaments. In 2011, he came up against brother-in-law John Peacock, who was managing the England U17 national team. Later that year, he was named head coach for the Canada U16 men's national team, and in 2012 and became head coach of the Canada U18 men's national team.

In March 2014, Gale took over as the head coach of the Canada U20 men's national team.

Valour FC 
On 26 June 2018, Gale was announced as the first head coach and general manager of Canadian Premier League club Valour FC. He was relieved from his duties on September 23, 2021.

Personal life 
Gale was born in Zambia to English parents while his father was working as a football coach. He also spent part of his childhood growing up in Tanzania before moving to England aged five. Living in Horley, Surrey, he attended Oakwood School and Reigate College before studying media production and broadcast journalism at the University of Luton.

In 2000, Gale visited Winnipeg, Manitoba for work and met his future wife Erin. After moving to Winnipeg permanently a year later, Gale and his partner married in 2003 and now have two daughters. Five members of his family have UEFA coaching licences, including brother-in-law John Peacock.

He is a lifelong Arsenal supporter.

Managerial statistics

References 

Living people
English footballers
American soccer players
Expatriate soccer managers in Canada
1977 births
Wycombe Wanderers F.C. players
Winnipeg Alliance players
Winnipeg Lucania FC players
Sons of Italy Lions SC players
Valour FC non-playing staff
Canadian Premier League coaches
Association football midfielders
English expatriate sportspeople in Canada
Expatriate soccer players in Canada
English expatriate footballers
English football managers